Bonab Rural District may refer to:
 Bonab Rural District (Marand County), East Azerbaijan province, Iran
 Bonab Rural District (Zanjan County), Zanjan province, Iran